The Day I Went Mad is the sixth solo album by English rock singer Graham Bonnet, originally released in 1999. Much like his previous solo efforts, Bonnet enlisted a host of guest musicians for the recording, including former Guns N' Roses guitarist Slash, Def Leppard guitarist Vivian Campbell and Vanilla Fudge bassist Tim Bogert. The album cover was illustrated by guitarist Mario Parga, who plays on several tracks.

Track listing
All songs written by Jo Eime, except where indicated.
"The Day I Went Mad" – 4:32
"Don't Look Down" (Colin Allen, Mick Ronson) – 5:38
"Killer" (Eime, Kevin Valentine, Danny Johnson) – 4:34
"Oh! Darling" (Lennon–McCartney) – 4:00
"Hey That's Me" – 4:32
"This Day" – 5:00
"Flying Not Falling" – 4:19
"Lolita Crush" – 4:53
"Model Inc." (Eime, Valentine, Johnson, Pat Regan) – 4:46
"Spiked!" – 2:30
"Greenwich Meantime" – 4:55

Personnel
Graham Bonnet – lead vocals, guitar
Kevin Valentine – drums            
Mario Parga – guitars on #01, 07, 08 and 11; solo on #01, 07, 08 and 11
John Thomas – guitars on #01, 03, 04, 05, 06, 08, 10 and 11; solo on #05, 06 and 10; keyboards on #10
Danny Johnson – guitars on #03 and 09; solo on #03 and 09
Vivian Campbell – guitars on #02; solo on #02
Slash – guitars on #04; solo on #04
Mark Eric – guitars on #11
Bruce Kulick – bass on #01, 02, 04 and 05
Tony Franklin – bass on #03, 06 and 08
Matt Boyd – bass on #07 and 10
Jamie Carter – bass on #09
Tim Bogert – bass on #11
Michael Alemania – keyboards on #01, 06, 07 and 08
Teddy Andreass – keyboards on #04

1999 albums
Graham Bonnet albums